Muloza is a village in Malawi on the border with Mozambique. It is 20 miles south of Mulanje and the Mulanje Massif and is a significant source of the country's maize.

References

Malawi–Mozambique border crossings
Populated places in Southern Region, Malawi